Benedikt Schwarzhaupt (born 14 January 2001) is a German field hockey player.

Career

Club level
In club competition, Schwarzhaupt plays for Uhlenhorster HC in the German Bundesliga.

Junior national team
Benedikt Schwarzhaupt made his debut for the German U–21 team in 2019. He represented the side at an invitational tournament in Madrid, as well as the EuroHockey Junior Championship in Valencia, where he won a gold medal.

In 2021, alongside Hannes Müller, Schwarzhaupt captained the junior team at the FIH Junior World Cup in Bhubaneswar.

Die Honamas
Schwarzhaupt made his debut for Die Honamas in 2021, during the second season of the FIH Pro League.

References

External links

2001 births
Living people
German male field hockey players
Male field hockey defenders
Uhlenhorster HC players
Men's Feldhockey Bundesliga players
21st-century German people